Thanchaiyan Srisuwan is a Thai military official, former serving as Thailand's Chief of Defence Forces, following his appointment by King Vajiralongkorn in September 2017, in an annual military reshuffle of senior officers. Prior to his appointment, he served as chief of joint staff.

Education and careers 
Thanchaiyan study at Wat Rajbopit School and then attending the Armed Forces Academies Preparatory School as a pre-cadet as a prerequisite for attending Chulachomklao Royal Military Academy (CRMA). After graduated in Military school, he studies at Command and General Staff College and Joint Services Command and Staff College in England.

Thanchaiyan previously held a position of Commander of 1st Cavalry Battalion, Head of Military Operations of Royal Thai Armed Forces and Chief of Staff to the Royal Thai Armed Forces and also Member of the National Legislative Assembly.

Awards
  The Most Exalted Order of the White Elephant
  The Most Noble Order of the Crown of Thailand
  Border Services Medal
 Honorary Airborne Wings of the Royal Thai Army

References 

Thanchaiyan Srisuwan
Living people
1958 births
Thanchaiyan Srisuwan
Thanchaiyan Srisuwan
Thanchaiyan Srisuwan